Cheere may refer to:

 Cheere baronets, created in the Baronetage of Great Britain on 19 July 1766
 Cheere Islands, Nunavut, Canada

People with the surname
 John Cheere, English sculptor
 Sir Henry Cheere, 1st Baronet (1776–1781)